Enrique Banchs (1888–1968) was an Argentine poet. He published all his work in the space of four years at the beginning of the 20th century. In his four works, Las barcas (1907), El libro de los elogios (1908), El cascabel del halcón (1909) and La urna (1911). Banchs cultivated an ephemeral, classicistic style drawing inspiration from the Siglo de Oro. His final work was composed in sonnets, a form which had already been almost completely abandoned by that time. Banchs published nothing during the final fifty years of his life, but he remained a part of the Argentine literary scene, and a member of the Argentine Academy of Letters. He was a friend of Carlos Alberto Leumann.

Works

Poetry
1907: Las barcas
1908: El libro de los elogios
1909: El cascabel del halcón
1911: La urna

Prose 
1941: Discurso de recepción en la Academia Argentina de Letras 
1943: Averiguaciones sobre la autoridad en el idioma

1888 births
1968 deaths
Argentine male poets
Writers from Buenos Aires
20th-century Argentine poets
20th-century Argentine male writers